The 2009 FILA European Wrestling Championships were held in Vilnius, Lithuania. The event took place from 31 March to 5 April 2009.

Bids
Five countries showed interest in hosting the tournament, but only two were shortlisted: Vilnius (Lithuania) and Antalya (Turkey). CELA picked Vilnius at 2008 in Tampere and FILA confirmed the choice in Beijing during Olympic games.

Venue 

Championships were held in Utenos pramogų arena.

Medal table

Team ranking

Medal summary

Men's freestyle

Men's Greco-Roman

Women's freestyle

References

External links
Official website

Europe
W
European Wrestling Championships
W
Wrestling in Lithuania
Sports competitions in Vilnius
2009 in European sport
March 2009 sports events in Europe
April 2009 sports events in Europe
21st century in Vilnius